"What About Us" is a single released by British-Irish girl group The Saturdays. Their first international single, it is the lead single from their first American-only release EP, Chasing the Saturdays (2013). It also acts as the second single from their fourth studio album Living for the Weekend (2013). The single was first released in the United States and Canada on 18 December 2012 via digital download, before being released in the United Kingdom on 16 March 2013 via CD single and digital download. The single was written by Camille Purcell, Ollie Jacobs, Philip Jacobs. There are two different versions of the track which have been recorded and released: a solo version, which was released exclusively in the US and Canada, and a version featuring Jamaican rapper Sean Paul, which was released internationally. Music critics gave the song positive feedback, but questioned the heavily auto-tuned chorus and the move away from the group's traditional sound.

A music video was released for the song was published and released via The Saturdays' Vevo account on 11 January 2013. The video was filmed in Los Angeles, where the band were filming their US reality series, Chasing the Saturdays, which is broadcast through E!. An acoustic version of "Somebody Else's Life", which can be heard on the opening titles of the show, was released as a B-side. The Saturdays went on to a promotional tour in order to get the song "out there" in the United States, and appeared on a number of different chat shows including The Tonight Show with Jay Leno, The Jeff Probst Show, Fashion Police, Chelsea Lately and The Today Show in New York City. They later went on to a promotional tour in the UK, visiting radio stations around the country.

"What About Us" gained commercial success, debuted at number one on the UK Singles Chart to become The Saturdays' twelfth UK top 10 single and first ever number-one. In Ireland, the song debuted at number six on the Irish Singles Chart, gaining the group their fifth top 10 single there. With first-week sales of 114,000 copies and 40,000 copies more sold than their closest competitor to number one, "What About Us" was the fastest-selling single of 2013 in the UK until it was overtaken by Naughty Boy's "La La La" two months later. In December 2013, it was announced as the eleventh fastest-selling single of the year overall. As of August 2014, the song has sold over 400,000 copies in the UK. On 23 December 2013, Mollie King posted a photo on Instagram of her holding a 500,000 sales plaque from their record label, with the message that "What About Us" had sold over 500,000 copies in UK and USA, with 120,000 copies in the US alone even without charting on the Billboard Hot 100.

Background 

In 2012, it was announced that the Saturdays had received an offer to star in their own reality television programme, Chasing the Saturdays, broadcast through E! Network. While filming their show, the band began visiting the recording studio, where they began work with Rodney "Darkchild" Jerkins.

The Saturdays felt comfortable with their US labels, and thanked them for not only giving them a chance in North America, but for making them feel at ease and welcome which took a lot of "weight of our shoulders". The band said they have always respected the labels due to the massive success they've had with artists. The band had been working with Demi Lovato in the recording studio.

Composition

"What About Us" was written and produced by Ollie Jacobs and acts as the Saturdays first single to be released in North America where it could appear on the Billboard Hot 100 and Canadian Hot 100. In America its release coincided with their TV show, Chasing the Saturdays. The track is the band's fourteenth single to be released in the United Kingdom and Ireland and the track is a dance-pop song. Before the release of the song, Mollie King said that the band were excited to share the track as they had the song "for months" She said: "I can't wait for everyone to hear it and to get to perform it. I'm just so excited about this one, I think it's going down really well." The band said they didn't want to change their type of music just for the American public and would stick to their roots and the genre they enjoyed to perform. King spoke: "We've always made a point that we don't want to change to go to America. We wanted to go over as we are and if they like us, they like us and if they don't, they don't!" King said that the track is reggae pop music, a little different from what band usually record, but the track is still really "dancey" and "upbeat", as well a good song to dance to on either stage or at a club. When Una Healy was asked what the song was about she said that she "did not know" what the song was exactly about. "To be honest I was trying to figure out the other day what exactly it's about. I could bullshit away telling you, but I really don't know. But I think it's all about someone driving you crazy." She said she "thinks" that 'What About Us' part means "me and you getting together". She did point out that she did know that the song was about "making you happy" and that the track was good for the summer and will get you on the dancefloor. The band teased saying that "What About Us" is a pop track, and that is a good indication of what the expect from the album, and that they've paired up with Diane Warren to record a few ballads and not just pop tracks. "What About Us" is the only collaboration on the album.

Release
"What About Us" was confirmed as the Saturdays' first single to be released in North America, and would be released on 18 December 2012 to coincide with their American reality show, Chasing the Saturdays. It was also revealed that the track would be released as the lead single from the band's North America released only Extended play, Chasing the Saturdays, which was named after the show. Some critics said that releasing "What About Us" from an EP for the US market was a "wise decision". One critic said: For, throwing out a traditional release on the back of a show that isn't (yet) a hit would ultimately be setting them up for failure. What's more, the EP allows their "storyline" for the next season of the show (should there be one) to revolve around recording an album. In the United Kingdom, it was revealed that "What About Us" would be the follow-up single from "30 Days" in the UK and Ireland, and therefore would not be the lead single from the band's fourth studio album. The band announced that before the release of the album, there would be another single release from the album. The follow-up single was revealed to be titled "Gentleman".

Just like all the band's previous singles, the record was accepted by all A-Lists at radio stations. The UK and Ireland version of the track features a guest rap from Sean Paul. Whereas the North American version does not feature vocals from Sean Paul and only vocals from the band. The original version of the track last 3 minutes and 24 seconds, whereas the version which features Sean Paul lasts 3 minutes and 40 seconds. The single was released with B-side, an Acoustic version of a brand new track, "Somebody Else's Life", which is the opening theme to Chasing the Saturdays. "What About Us" was released as a digital download EP, and this featured the single version which features Sean Paul, the solo version and the B-side track. Upon the release in North America, there was a digital remixes EP which featured remixes of "What About Us" by a number of DJs including: Seamus Haji, Guy Scheiman, the Buzz Junkies and 2nd Adventure and this was also made available to purchase on 18 December 2012. While in the UK, the CD single was made available to be from stores from 18 March 2013. On the CD single featured "What About Us", the B-side "Somebody Else's Life".

The band decided to release "What About Us" differently between the United Kingdom and the United States, "What About Us" was released onto the charts without any airplay and without a music video accompanying the release, something the band experienced in the UK, with "Notorious". Whereas in the UK, "What About Us" was released with airplay and the music video being released before the release of the single. During this time, Frankie Sandford became ambassadors for mental health after Sandford battled depression. The band said they choose "What About Us" to be the lead single in the US and follow-up single from "30 Days" because they all loved it once they demoed it and it gave them a "really good feeling" They also said it is a fresh start for a new album, with a "reggae vibe", but still a pop record. The Saturdays said that Sean Paul was "perfect" for the UK version of the song. They said that he was "just so nice" and that he would be present during some of the promotional performances when the single was released.

Critical reception
Robert Copsey of Digital Spy said that Rochelle Humes asks in a "curious Jamaican-flecked timbre" during the intro of "What About Us". During the lyrics "Oh why are we are waiting so long I'm suffocating", and he went on to say that it is in reference to "man-related drama" and also pointing out that there is plenty of that on their reality series, Chasing the Saturdays. Copsey later went on to tip the band for their first number-one single as he said: "but we suspect it could also be a sly wink at their enduring quest for a number one single". He said that track was "radio-friendly" due to the "trace beats" and "demanding their contrary lover to give up the hard-to-get schtick sharpish". Although he didn't think that the song was "original" enough for the band, but is "strangely addictive" and he would be happy to see the song at the top of the charts.

4Music described the song as an "electro-pop affair with a bucket-load of synths thrown in for good measure. It's quite good, but we wonder if they should reconsider this single choice if they truly want to launch an invasion on America's charts." Idolator wrote a mixed review criticizing the track for lacking the group's signature style; "While the beat is pounding enough to nab the girls a chart hit, it doesn't feel true to the spirit of The Sats. Then again, maybe it isn't supposed to." Jessica Sager from PopCrush also touched on the departure from their original sound; "It's a pretty big departure from their usual sugary oeuvre, but not necessarily in a bad way." She went on to praise Sean Paul's feature; "His presence on the track gives it an air of authenticity and fun, but pretty much only during his own verses and interjections." However, she criticised the mediocre attempt at dialect the groups sing in throughout the track; "When the Saturdays try to emulate island tones, it sounds a little awkward and they start out like that right off the bat, but go in and out of the undistinguished dialect throughout the song." She also felt that the heavily Auto-Tuned chorus was not need; "The Auto-Tune seems extraneous, because the Saturdays can actually sing well without it." She end the review by labeling their latest effort as "generic" and "not the best the Saturdays have to offer", also rating it two and a half stars out of five.

Commercial reception
"What About Us" debuted at number 44 on the US Billboard Hot Dance Club Songs chart for the week dated 8 December 2012. This marks their first ever chart entry in the United States and it has since peaked at number twenty-seven. The song debuted at number 79 on the Canadian Hot 100, becoming the highest Canadian debut for a new artist in 2013.

The Saturdays admitted that they did not want to get their hopes up on debuting at number one on the UK Singles Charts due to being beaten to number-one three times before with "Forever Is Over", "Just Can't Get Enough" and "Missing You", after being number one on the Official Chart Update. During the latter two occasions, it was rapper Flo Rida who had pushed them back to numbers two and three respectively. It was revealed that the Saturdays had knocked Justin Timberlake's "Mirrors" off the number-one spot on the UK Singles Chart. This became the band's first ever number-one single in the United Kingdom, it also became Sean Paul's second number one in the United Kingdom after being featured on "Breathe" in 2003. For every one copy that Timberlake's "Mirrors" sold, the Saturdays sold two more copies of "What About Us". "What About Us" sold 114,000 copies in the first week of release, making it, at the time, the fastest selling single of 2013. The track sold 40,000 copies more than Timberlake, who was pushed back to number-two on the UK Singles Charts. The band said they were thrilled to be the UK's number-one with "What About Us". They went on to thanking their fans for supporting the single and supporting them for the past five years.

"What About Us" debuted at number six on the Irish Singles Chart, marking the band's fifth top ten single in that country. "What About Us" made its debut at number thirty-six on the New Zealand Singles Chart.

Music video
The music video for "What About Us" was filmed during the summer of 2012 in Los Angeles, while the Saturdays were filming their reality television series. The North American version of the video was released via the Saturdays' official Vevo account on YouTube on 11 January 2013. A variant of the video, featuring vocals and additional scenes of the women with Sean Paul, was later released on 5 February 2013.

Live performances and promotion
The Saturdays appeared in a number of nightclubs throughout 2012 in the United States performing "What About Us" along other hits. On 14 January 2013, the group made their first televised performance of the single on The Tonight Show with Jay Leno. It was their first performance done on American television. On 16 January, the girls performed "What About Us" on The Today Show in New York City. Along with the performances, they appeared on chat shows such as Chelsea Lately, Daybreak, Fashion Police, Lorraine, The Jeff Probst Show, Loose Women, Alan Carr: Chatty Man, Sunday Brunch and What's Cooking? to promote the single.

Track listings
US digital download
"What About Us" – 3:24

CD single – UK Version Only
"What About Us" (featuring Sean Paul) – 3:40
"What About Us" – 3:24
"Somebody Else's Life" (Acoustic) – 3:18

US Digital remixes EP
"What About Us" (Seamus Haji Radio Edit) – 3:06
"What About Us" (Seamus Haji Club Mix) – 6:35
"What About Us" (Seamus Haji Dub) – 6:49
"What About Us" (Guy Scheiman Radio Edit) – 3:59
"What About Us" (Guy Scheiman Club Mix) – 7:35
"What About Us" (Guy Scheiman Dub) – 7:20
"What About Us" (The Buzz Junkies Radio Edit) – 3:23
"What About Us" (The Buzz Junkies Club Mix) – 4:32
"What About Us" (featuring Sean Paul) – 4:32
"What About Us" (2nd Adventure Radio Edit) – 4:24
"What About Us" (2nd Adventure Club Mix) – 6:36

Europe and Oceania EP – digital download
"What About Us" (featuring Sean Paul) – 3:40
"What About Us" (featuring Sean Paul) [The Buzz Junkies Radio Edit] – 3:23
"What About Us" (featuring Sean Paul) [Seamus Haji Radio Edit] – 3:37
"What About Us" (Guy Scheiman Radio Edit) – 3:58
"What About Us" (Extended Mix) – 3:49 (only available through pre-order)

UK Digital Remixes EP
"What About Us" (Guy Scheiman Club Mix) – 7:35
"What About Us" (2nd Adventure Club Mix) – 6:36
"What About Us" (Seamus Haji Club Mix) – 6:35
"What About Us" (The Buzz Junkies Club Mix) – 4:32
"What About Us" (2nd Adventure Radio Edit) – 4:24

Revamped Version
"What About Us" – 3:24
"Somebody Else's Life" (Acoustic) – 3:18
"What About Us" (Extended Mix) – 3:49
"What About Us" (2nd Adventure Radio Edit) – 4:24
"What About Us" (Guy Scheiman Radio Edit) – 3:58
"What About Us" (featuring Sean Paul) – 4:32
"What About Us" (featuring Sean Paul) [The Buzz Junkies Radio Edit] – 3:23
"What About Us" (featuring Sean Paul) [Seamus Haji Radio Edit] – 3:37
"What About Us" (2nd Adventure Club Mix) – 6:36
"What About Us" (Guy Scheiman Club Mix) – 7:35
"What About Us" (The Buzz Junkies Club Mix) – 4:32
"What About Us" (Seamus Haji Club Mix) – 6:35

Credits and personnel
"What About Us" was recorded at Rollover Studios in London.

Ollie Jacobs a.k.a. Art Bastian  ~ Songwriter, Producer, Vocal Producer, Mix Engineer

Phillip Jacobs ~ co-writer
Camille Purcell ~  co-writer
The Saturdays  ~  vocals
Sean Paul ~  guest vocalist

Charts and certifications

Weekly charts

Year-end charts

Certifications

Release and radio history

See also

List of UK Singles Chart number ones of the 2010s

References

External links

 feat. Sean Paul

The Saturdays songs
Sean Paul songs
2012 singles
Dance-pop songs
Number-one singles in Scotland
UK Singles Chart number-one singles
Songs written by Kamille (musician)
2012 songs
Fascination Records singles
Songs written by Ollie Jacobs